is a village located in West Tokyo, the western portion of Tokyo Metropolis, Japan. , the village had an estimated population of 2,101, and a population density of 20 persons per km2. It is the only administrative unit left in the non-insular area of Tokyo that is still classified as a village.

Geography
Hinohara lies in the mountainous upper reaches of the Akigawa, a tributary of the Tama River. The highest point is the summit of Mount Mitō at 1528 m. 93% of its area is forest.Motoshuku, at the confluence of the north and south branches of the Akigawa, is the center of the village and is where the village offices are located. Mountains in Hinohara include Shōtō (990 m), Ichimichi (795 m), Kariyose (687 m), Usuki (842), and Ōdake (1267 m).

The name Hinohara means the field or forest of Chamaecyparis obtusa. Formerly the trees were cut down to provide timber to build wooden structures in Edo.

Surrounding municipalities
Tokyo Metropolis
Hachiōji (to the east)
Akiruno (to the east)
Okutama (to the north)
Kanagawa Prefecture
Sagamihara (to the west)
Yamanashi Prefecture
Uenohara

Climate
Hinohara has a Humid subtropical climate (Köppen Cfa) characterized by warm summers and cool winters with light to no snowfall.  The average annual temperature in Hinohara is 11.8 °C. The average annual rainfall is 2091 mm with September as the wettest month. The temperatures are highest on average in August, at around 23.2 °C, and lowest in January, at around 0.3 °C.

Demographics
Per Japanese census data, the population of Hinohara has been decreasing since the 1950s, and is now less than half of what it was a century ago.

History
The area of present-day Hinohara was part of ancient Musashi Province. In the post-Meiji Restoration cadastral reform of July 22, 1878, the area became part of Nishitama District in Kanagawa Prefecture. The village of Hinohara was created on April 1, 1889 with the establishment of the modern municipalities system. Nishitama District was transferred to the administrative control of Tokyo Metropolis on April 1, 1893.

Government
Hinohara has a mayor-council form of government with a directly elected mayor and a unicameral village council of nine members. The village has 57 employees. Hinohara, collectively with the municipalities of Akiruno, Fussa, Hamura, Hinode, Mizuho and Okutama,   contributes two members to the Tokyo Metropolitan Assembly.  In terms of national politics, the village is part of Tokyo 25th district of the lower house of the Diet of Japan.

Economy
The principal industries of Hinohara are forestry and timber production. These days it is not as active as it used to be, but some young people are trying to run a new forestry company. Recently, the quarrying industry has been used to mine stones from mountains. Also, many construction companies also receive public works orders.

In sunny areas on the mountain slopes, potatoes and konjaku are grown. Wasabi, mushrooms and cyclamen are also grown there.

In addition, Hinohara has many guest houses, inns, campsites, fishing grounds, hot springs, souvenir shops, and restaurants. These are service industries for tourists who come in search of abundant nature.

Education
The village has one public elementary school, Hinohara Elementary School (檜原小学校), and one public junior high school, Hinohara Junior High School (檜原中学校).

Transportation

Railway
Hinohara has no passenger railway service. The main form of public transportation is bus. Scheduled bus service is available from Musashi-Itsukaichi Station on the JR East Itsukaichi Line.

Highway
Hinohara has no national expressways or national highways.  Tokyo Routes 33, 205, and 206 carry vehicular traffic.

References

External links

Hinohara Village Official Website 

Villages of Tokyo
Western Tokyo